Brad MacGregor (born July 22, 1964) is a Canadian former professional ice hockey player.

MacGregor attended Boston University, where he played four seasons (1982–1986) of NCAA college hockey with the Boston University Terriers, scoring 24 goals and 43 assists for 67 points while earning 86 penalty minutes in 150 games played.

MacGregor went on to play three seasons of professional hockey, playing in both the American Hockey League and International Hockey League, before hanging up his skates following the 1988–89 AHL season spent with the Cape Breton Oilers.

In 1989, MacGregor joined the Edmonton Oilers of the National Hockey League as a sales and marketing representative. He was the vice-president of sales when he let go by the Oilers in October 2011.

Career statistics

References

External links

1964 births
Living people
Boston University Terriers men's ice hockey players
Canadian ice hockey centres
Cape Breton Oilers players
Edmonton Oilers executives
Nova Scotia Oilers players
Saginaw Generals players
Saginaw Hawks players
Ice hockey people from Edmonton